Stockdale is a city in Wilson County, Texas, United States. The population was 1,413 at the 2020 census. It is part of the San Antonio Metropolitan Statistical Area.

History
Previously an area named High Prairie, Free Timber and Bunker's Store, Stockdale was named after Fletcher Stockdale, the lieutenant governor of Texas, when the town was established in 1863.  In 1898 the San Antonio and Mexican Gulf Railroad reached Stockdale. The town was incorporated in 1919, and Stockdale's annual Watermelon Jubilee began in 1937.

Geography

Stockdale is located at  (29.235974, –97.963888).

Climate

The climate in this area is characterized by hot, humid summers and generally mild to cool winters.  According to the Köppen climate classification system, Stockdale has a humid subtropical climate, Cfa on climate maps.

Demographics

As of the 2020 United States census, there were 1,413 people, 419 households, and 339 families residing in the city.

As of the census of 2000,  1,398 people, 497 households, and 337 families resided in the city. The population density was 865.3 people per square mile (333.2/km). The 556 housing units averaged 344.2/sq mi (132.5/km). The racial makeup of the city was 74.54% White, 2.36% African American, 0.21% Native American, 0.14% Asian, 21.03% from other races, and 1.72% from two or more races. Hispanics or Latinos of any race were 45.99% of the population.

Of the 497 households, 34.0% had children under the age of 18 living with them, 53.3% were married couples living together, 10.3% had a female householder with no husband present, and 32.0% were not families. About 28.4% of all households were made up of individuals, and 16.1% had someone living alone who was 65 years of age or older. The average household size was 2.68 and the average family size was 3.33.

In the city, the population was distributed as 26.5% under the age of 18, 8.5% from 18 to 24, 25.6% from 25 to 44, 20.2% from 45 to 64, and 19.2% who were 65 years of age or older. The median age was 37 years. For every 100 females, there were 93.4 males. For every 100 females age 18 and over, there were 86.9 males.

The median income for a household in the city was $30,337, and for a family was $39,667. Males had a median income of $29,583 versus $20,395 for females. The per capita income for the city was $15,102. About 10.8% of families and 14.5% of the population were below the poverty line, including 15.5% of those under age 18 and 20.9% of those age 65 or over.

Education
The City of Stockdale is served by the Stockdale Independent School District and home to the Stockdale High School Brahmas.

References

External links
 Stockdale Economic Development Corporation

Cities in Wilson County, Texas
Cities in Texas
Greater San Antonio